Dalet is the fourth letter of many Semitic  alphabets.

Dalet may also refer to:
 Dalet, Burma a town in Rakhine State of Burma (Myanmar)
 Masada: Dalet, a 1995 album by American composer and saxophonist John Zorn
 Dalet, a neighborhood of Beersheba, Israel
 Dalet School, a private school in Bethel Pennsylvania operated by the Assemblies of Yahweh

See also 
 Company Dalet, a unit in the Israeli military prison, Prison Four
 Plan Dalet, a plan worked out by the Haganah, a Jewish paramilitary group and the forerunner of the Israel Defense Forces, in Palestine in autumn 1947 to spring 1948
 Dalit, or the designation as "untouchable" in the Hindu caste system
Dalek, a type of alien from Doctor Who